Gillmeria melanoschista is a moth of the family Pterophoridae described by Thomas Bainbrigge Fletcher in 1940. It is found in Russia (eastern Siberia and the Kuril Islands) and Japan.

References

Moths described in 1940
Platyptiliini
Moths of Asia
Moths of Japan